James Boe (5 January 1891 – 1973) was an English professional footballer who played as a goalkeeper for Sunderland.

References

1891 births
1973 deaths
Footballers from Gateshead
English footballers
Association football goalkeepers
Sunderland A.F.C. players
Southport F.C. players
English Football League players